Maria Sol Muñoz (born 6 December 1975) is an Ecuadorian lawyer, and a member of the FIFA Council, where she represents the Confederación Sudamericana de Fútbol (Conmebol).

Muñoz was born in Ecuador on 6 December 1975.

Muñoz is the first woman to represent South America before FIFA Council.

References

FIFA officials
Football in Ecuador
Living people
1975 births